This is a list of players who played at least one game for the Cleveland Crusaders of the World Hockey Association from 1972–73 to 1975–76.



A
Ray Adduono,
Ron Anderson,
Paul Andrea

B
Blake Ball,
Terry Ball,
Paul Baxter,
Brian Bowles,
Doug Brindley,
Ron Buchanan,
Brad Buetow

C
Steve Cardwell,
Jacques Caron,
Gerry Cheevers,
Ray Clearwater,
Wayne Connelly,
Mike Conroy,
Norm Cournoyer

D
Bob Dillabough

E
Tom Edur,
Grant Erickson,
Bill Evo

G
Danny Gruen

H
John Hanna,
Jocelyn Hardy,
Jim Harrison,
Bill Heindl,
Larry Hillman,
Wayne Hillman,
Ted Hodgson,
Terry Holbrook,
Ralph Hopiavuori,
Bill Horton

J
Gary Jarrett,
Bob Johnson

K
Skip Krake

L
Rich LeDuc,
Barry Legge,
Randy Legge

M
Gary MacGregor,
Bryan Maxwell,
Al McDonough,
Ray McKay,
Jim McMasters,
Lyle Moffat,
Ron Morgan,
Wayne Muloin

N
Robbie Neale,
Cam Newton

P
Gerry Pinder,
Rich Pumple

R
Al Rycroft

S
Glen Shirton,
Paul Shmyr,
John Stewart (born 1950),
John Stewart (born 1954)

T
Juhani Tamminen

W
Russ Walker,
Ron Ward,
Bob Whidden,
Jim Wiste

Y
Bill Young

References
Cleveland Crusaders all-time player roster at hockeydb.com

   
Cleveland Crusaders
Cleveland Crusaders players